Bruno Schulz (24 February 1865, in Friedeberg – 1 April 1932, in Berlin) was a German architectural historian.

From 1893 onward, he was employed as a Regierungsbaumeister (government architect) in Berlin. In 1897-98 he accompanied Friedrich Sarre on a research trip to Persia, and after his return to Europe, lived and worked in Venice during the years 1899–1900. He then served as technical director of the German archaeological excavation at Baalbek (1900–1904). Later on, he taught classes on the morphology of classical and Renaissance architecture at the Technical University of Hannover, and in 1912 was appointed professor of architecture at the Technical University of Berlin.

Published works 
 Das Grabmal des Theoderich zu Ravenna und seine Stellung in der Architekturgeschichte, 1911 – The tomb of Theodoric at Ravenna and its place in architectural history.
 Ardabil : Grabmoschee des Schech Safi, 1924  (main author, Friedrich Sarre) – Ardabil, The grave-mosque of Sheikh Safi.
 Die Kirchenbauten auf der Insel Torcello aufgenommen, 1927 – The churches on the island of Torcello.
 Römische Tempel in Syrien, nach Aufnahmen und Untersuchungen von Mitgliedern der Deutschen Baalbekexpedition 1901-1904, (with Otto Puchstein, Daniel Krencker) – Roman temple in Syria; Recordings and studies by members of the German Baalbek Expedition.

References

External links
 

1865 births
1932 deaths
German architectural historians
People from Strzelce-Drezdenko County
People from the Province of Brandenburg
Academic staff of the Technical University of Berlin
German male non-fiction writers